Little Longstone is a village and civil parish in Derbyshire, England. The village is on a minor road west of Great Longstone, just off the B6465 road from Wardlow to Ashford-in-the-Water. There is a Grade-II-listed Congregational Chapel and a public house, the Packhorse Inn, in the village. As in many small parishes, there is no parish council and local democracy is administered via a parish meeting.

The parish includes parts of Monsal Dale and the hamlet of Monsal Head, and lies wholly within the Peak District National Park. The Monsal Trail, a popular cycleway and footpath following a section of the former Manchester, Buxton, Matlock and Midlands Junction Railway, runs just south of the village.

Listed buildings and scheduled monuments
There are nine listed buildings in the parish (all listed at Grade II):

village stocks and adjacent house
Manor House, stable block and Dutch barn
Packhorse Inn
Monsal Dale Viaduct (also known as Headstone Viaduct)
Congregational Chapel
Cosy Cottage and adjoining cottage

and four scheduled monuments, comprising one disused lead mine and a series of bowl barrows:
White Cliff bowl barrow
a bowl barrow west of Castlegate Lane
two bowl barrows east of Hay Dale
Putwell Hill Mine

References

Villages in Derbyshire
Civil parishes in Derbyshire
Derbyshire Dales